Balıkesir High School, in Balıkesir, Turkey, was founded in 1885 with the name of Balıkesir Sultanisi.

Notable Alumnies
 Attilâ İlhan
 Bedii Faik Akın
 Burhan Özfatura
 Çolpan İlhan
 İbrahim Bodur
 İlker Ayrık
 Kenan Evren
 Mehmet Ali Erbil
 Tanju Okan
 Yusuf Atılgan

External links
Official Web Page
Official Alumnies Web Page

References

High schools in Balıkesir
Educational institutions established in 1885
Education in the Ottoman Empire
1885 establishments in the Ottoman Empire